A significant four-day outbreak of tornadoes impacted areas across the High Plains, central Midwest, and parts of the Ohio Valley in early May. The outbreak also produced the first EF4 tornado of the year in Katie, Oklahoma on May 9, where one death occurred. An EF3 tornado near Connerville, Oklahoma also killed a person that day. Other notable tornadoes included two large EF2 tornadoes in Colorado on May 7, a large EF2 tornado near Catherine, Kansas on May 8, and a destructive EF3 tornado that struck Mayfield, Kentucky on May 10. Overall, 57 tornadoes were confirmed.

Meteorological synopsis 
The tornado outbreak developed along a cold front alongside an area of low pressure while situated north of the United States–Canada border. Near the High Plains, a dry line began to coalesce as wind shear started climbing to levels favorable for tornadoes. In addition, moisture from the Gulf of Mexico was advected northwards into the country. Not long afterwards, tornadic supercell thunderstorms began developing late on May 7.

Tornadic activity started with a large multiple-vortex EF2 tornado that tossed several RVs into the air and injured two people near Wiggins, Colorado on May 7. Later that evening, a large stovepipe tornado caused high-end EF2 damage near the town of Wray, while several other tornadoes tracked across other very rural areas of Colorado, causing no damage. Scattered tornadoes occurred on May 8, most of which were weak. However, a strong EF2 tornado caused considerable damage to outbuildings and high-voltage transmission line poles near Catharine, Kansas. On May 9, a significant tornado event unfolded across Oklahoma, as several strong to violent tornadoes touched down and caused severe damage in several portions of the state. A violent EF4 stovepipe tornado (the first EF4 of 2016 and the first violent tornado in the United States since an EF4 in Garland, Texas on December 26, 2015) near Katie, Oklahoma killed one person, leveled and swept away multiple homes, and left behind an extensive swath of ground scouring, while a large EF3 wedge tornado from the same parent supercell caused major damage near Sulphur. An EF3 tornado that tracked from near Connerville to Bromide destroyed a house and killed one person. Other strong tornadoes occurred as far north as Nebraska, including an EF2 tornado that tore the roof and some exterior walls from a home near Nehawka and injured one person. An EF1 tornado also caused minor damage in residential areas of Lincoln. Significant tornado activity continued on May 10, as several tornadoes moved across areas of western Kentucky, including an EF3 tornado that injured 10 people as it moved through the north edge of Mayfield, Kentucky, destroying numerous homes, vehicles, and businesses. Another tornado caused EF2 damage near Hartford. Overall, this outbreak killed two people and produced 57 tornadoes.

Confirmed tornadoes

May 7 event

May 8 event

May 9 event

May 10 event

Katie–Wynnewood, Oklahoma

This violent, erratic, stovepipe tornado touched down to the south of Katie, Oklahoma at 4:06 PM CDT, initially snapping trees at EF1 intensity along County Road N3170. Additional trees were snapped along N3180 Road before the tornado intensified to EF3 strength east of that location, where a home was left with only interior walls standing and large trees were denuded and stripped of foliage. A home at the edge of the damage path had its windows blown out. The tornado maintained EF3 strength and started intensifying further as it crossed N3210 Road, where several trees were debarked and ground scouring began occurring. A house near the south edge of the damage path had its roof torn right off, and power poles were snapped as well. Shortly afterwards, the tornado inflicted EF4 damage near the intersection of Indian Meridian Road and E1680 Road, where a well-built, anchor-bolted brick home was almost entirely flattened with a large portion of the foundation slab swept clean of debris. Trees in this area were debarked, and extensive ground scouring occurred. Also, vehicles were thrown and mangled beyond recognition. Another brick house had its roof torn off as well, and multiple power poles were snapped. Further to the east, a poorly-anchored frame home was swept cleanly away at high-end EF3 intensity. A nearby mobile home was also destroyed, along with a vehicle parked nearby that was rolled across the edge of a nearby pond and severely damaged. Several other homes in this area sustained less severe damage. The tornado weakened dramatically as it crossed N3250 Road, snapping and uprooting several trees before dissipating near Interstate 35 to the southwest of Wynnewood at 4:27 PM CDT. This tornado was highly photogenic, and it was photographed and caught on video by numerous storm chasers. One person was killed by the tornado.

Davis–Sulphur–Roff, Oklahoma

This large, high-end EF3 wedge tornado was spawned by the same supercell that produced the EF4 Katie/Wynnewood tornado earlier. It first touched down to the north of Davis, Oklahoma at 4:34 PM CDT, initially snapping trees at EF1 strength near U.S. Route 77. The tornado then moved across a large open field and began widening significantly before it reached high-end EF2 strength and crossed Sunshine Road, completely destroying a poorly–constructed house and tossing a pickup truck hundreds of feet into a nearby field. Numerous trees and power poles were snapped, and a brick home lost part of its roof here. The tornado intensified as it crossed Meadow Road further to the east, where trees were debarked and an unanchored home was swept completely away at high-end EF3 strength. Two poorly-constructed homes lost their roofs and their exterior walls in this area as well, therefore sustaining EF2 damage. Widespread EF3 damage occurred as the tornado crossed Burnside Road, where multiple homes were left with only their interior walls standing. Also in this area, mobile homes and outbuildings were obliterated, and some unanchored block foundation homes were leveled and swept away. A large metal storage garage was swept away as well, with vehicles stored inside being thrown up to 280 yards away. Several trees were debarked, and numerous metal power poles were bent to the ground. At one home in this area, 18-year-old resident Daniel Parks and his cousin survived the tornado without injury by taking shelter in an interior bathroom and hanging on to a toilet. The bathroom was the only room left standing after the tornado had passed.

Soon afterwards, trees were uprooted and outbuildings were destroyed along Trett Slab Road and E1690 Road before more significant damage occurred further to the east, where several frame homes and mobile homes were heavily damaged or destroyed along Buel Green Road and Nelson Road. One unanchored home in this area was swept completely away at high-end EF3 intensity, and outbuildings were destroyed as well. More metal power poles were bent to the ground, and a couple of trees were debarked. RaXPol mobile radar recorded winds exceeding 200 MPH 17 meters over an open field in this area, though this small pocket of winds, possibly capable of producing EF5-level damage, did not impact any substantial structures. Because of this, damage ratings in this area did not exceed high-end EF3. The tornado then crossed W 14th St, briefly weakening to EF2 strength as it destroyed a mobile home, shifted a frame home off its foundation, and caused roof damage to other homes. More outbuildings were destroyed, one of which had a small trailer thrown into it. North of Sulphur, the tornado crossed U.S. Route 177 at EF3 intensity. Several frame homes lost their roofs and had collapse of exterior walls. Some additional trees sustained debarking, a mobile home was swept away and destroyed, and a few other homes had their roofs torn off at this location. A large frame home east of the interstate that was under construction was reduced to a bare slab as well. As the tornado continued eastward, it produced high-end EF2 damage along N3400 Road as two small homes were left with only their interior walls standing, one of which homes was pushed 60 feet off of its foundation. The tornado then began to narrow and weaken as it crossed the Chickasaw Turnpike and County Line Road intersection, causing mainly minor damage to trees, power lines, and outbuildings, though one home and a large metal shed both sustained low-end EF2 damage. The tornado continued to narrow as it moved further east, producing EF0 outbuilding damage before dissipating to the southwest of Roff at 5:17 PM CDT.

See also
List of North American tornadoes and tornado outbreaks
May 22–26, 2016 tornado outbreak sequence – Another significant outbreak that affected similar areas less than two weeks after this one.

Notes

References

Tornadoes of 2016
2016 natural disasters in the United States
F4 tornadoes by date
 ,2016-05-07
May 2016 events